Events in the year 1921 in Portugal.

Incumbents
President: António José de Almeida
Prime Ministers: Seven different

Events
6 March – Portuguese Communist Party founded
10 July – Portuguese legislative election, 1921.

Arts and entertainment

Sports
Gondomar S.C. founded
A.D. Ovarense founded
S.C. Braga founded

Births
4 August – Carlos Galvão de Melo, military officer and politician (died 2008)

Deaths

7 June – Sebastião Custódio de Sousa Teles, military officer and politician (born 1847)
19 October – António Granjo, lawyer and politician (born 1881)

References

 
1920s in Portugal
Years of the 20th century in Portugal